Calor Urbano is a band from the Dominican Republic that was formed in late 2002 when its members decided to make a mixture of the different musical styles that influenced them.

After some months of work, the band, with little more than a dozen songs, produced what later became their first single, Calor Urbano, recorded with the production and engineering of Mike Rodríguez and José Bordas, recognized producers who have worked with well-known musicians and groups of the Dominican Republic. The single was sent to national radio stations in 2003. It became a quick hit, reaching the top of music charts and receiving good reviews by recognized members of the musical scene.

In the first semester of 2003, Calor Urbano began a process of organization and restructuring. Towards the end of the same year the band released the second promotional single Vertigo and in mid-2004 they took over listings with their third single To Soul, placing Calor Urbano among the top bands of the Dominican Republic by releasing three consecutive singles in one year, all three of which became very popular. The same year, they were nominated as best pop/rock band of the year in the Premios del Pueblo awards.

In 2005, Calor Urbano signed their first record deal with Azares Entertainment, a Dominican record company, and released their first official album, Transmission Groove, in the summer of 2006. The band, which is currently formed by Vicente Garcia as lead vocalist, Adolfo Guerrero as M.C, Joel Berrido on the bass guitar and Carlos Chapuseaux playing lead guitars, as well as many other musicians who accompany them on live performances, tries to mix soul, funk and hip-hop as well as Latin pop influences, creating a unique musical style.

External links 
Calor Urbano´s Official Page
Calor Urbano's MySpace profile

Latin American music
Dominican Republic musical groups